Storckiella vitiensis is a species of plant in the family Fabaceae. It is found only in Fiji.

References

Dialioideae
Endemic flora of Fiji
Vulnerable plants
Taxonomy articles created by Polbot